Sif Atladóttir (born 15 July 1985) is an Icelandic footballer and a member of the Iceland women's national team. Prior to playing professionally abroad, she won the Icelandic Championship three years in a row with Valur, from 2007 to 2009.

Club career 

Sif, who began her career as a forward but later developed into a pacey full back, left Icelandic club Valur for German side 1. FC Saarbrücken in the 2009–10 winter transfer window.

In 2011, she moved to Kristianstads DFF following Saarbrücken's relegation. She missed the 2020 season due to being pregnant with her second child. She returned to the court in April 2021 in her first competitive game since October 2019.

In October 2021, Sif announced that she was moving to Iceland after 12 years playing abroad.

International career 
Sif is currently part of Iceland's national team and competed in the UEFA Women's Championships in 2009 and 2013.

She made her senior national team debut in a 2–1 defeat to Italy at the Algarve Cup in March 2007.

On January 23, 2018, Sif played her seventieth game for the national team, the same number of games her father played for the men's national team.

Personal life 
Sif is the daughter of Atli Eðvaldsson, former captain and coach of the men's national team. She was born in Germany while her father was playing professionally for Fortuna Düsseldorf.

Her brother Emil Atlason is also a footballer who plays for KR and the Iceland national under-21 football team, while sister Sara Atladóttir played for FH and the women's under-17 and under-19 national teams. Uncle Jóhannes "Shuggy" Eðvaldsson played for Celtic.

Titles
Icelandic Champion: (3)
2007, 2008, 2009
Icelandic Cup:
2009
Icelandic Super Cup: (3)
2007, 2008, 2009
Icelandic League Cup: 
2007

References

External links
 
 
 
 Player German domestic football stats  at DFB
 

1985 births
Living people
1. FC Saarbrücken (women) players
Damallsvenskan players
Expatriate women's footballers in Germany
Expatriate women's footballers in Sweden
Sif Atladottir
Footballers from Düsseldorf
Frauen-Bundesliga players
Sif Atladottir
Sif Atladottir
Sif Atladottir
Sif Atladottir
Sif Atladottir
Sif Atladottir
Kristianstads DFF players
Sif Atladottir
Women's association football defenders
UEFA Women's Euro 2022 players
UEFA Women's Euro 2017 players